The 1935 Monaco Grand Prix (formally the VII Grand Prix de Monaco) was a Grand Prix motor race held on 22 April 1935.

Classification

Fastest lap: Luigi Fagioli, 1'58"4 s (96.7 km/h - 60.1 mph)

References

External links

Monaco
Monaco Grand Prix
Grand Prix